In America is a 2002 road drama film directed by Jim Sheridan. The semi-autobiographical screenplay by Jim Sheridan and his daughters, Naomi and Kirsten, focuses on an immigrant Irish family's struggle to start a new life in New York City, as seen through the eyes of the elder daughter.

The film was an Irish, American and British co-production, and was nominated for three Academy Awards: Best Original Screenplay for the Sheridans, Best Actress for Samantha Morton and Best Supporting Actor for Djimon Hounsou.

Plot
In 2002, Johnny and Sarah Sullivan and their daughters Christy and Ariel enter the United States on a tourist visa from Ireland via Canada, where Johnny was working as an actor. The family settles in New York City, in a rundown Hell's Kitchen tenement occupied by drug addicts, transvestites, and a reclusive Nigerian artist/photographer named Mateo Kuamey. Hanging over the family is the death of their five-year-old son Frankie, who died from a brain tumor discovered after a fall down the stairs. The devout Roman Catholic Johnny questions God and has lost any ability to feel true emotions, which has affected his relationship with his family. Christy believes she has been granted three wishes by her dead brother, which she only uses at times of near-dire consequences for the family as they try to survive in New York.

After finding the apartment, Sarah gets a job in the local ice cream parlor to support the family while Johnny auditions for any role for which he is suited, with no success. Despite their poverty, the initial joy of being in the United States and the closeness of the family gives them the energy to make the most of what they have, and Christy chronicles the events of their life with a cherished camcorder. As money runs low and the city's temperatures soar, the family dip into savings to go to the movies to see E.T. the Extra-Terrestrial and enjoy the air conditioning to find respite from the oppressive weather. Tensions between Johnny and Sarah begin to rise with the summer heat. Not helping their financial and emotional strain is the discovery that Sarah is pregnant.  Eventually Johnny finds work as a cab driver to augment their income and help pay for the girls' Catholic school tuition.

On Halloween, the girls become friendly with Mateo when they knock at his door to trick-or-treat. Despite Johnny's reticence about the somewhat imposing and forbidding man, Sarah invites him to their apartment for dinner, and eventually they learn that the man is sad and lonely because he is dying of AIDS. 
Later, Mateo falls down a flight of stairs and is knocked unconscious. Christy tries to resuscitate him using CPR, although she is warned away from him by the other residents, who seem to be aware that he is HIV-positive. The man's condition continues to deteriorate as Sarah's fetus develops. The baby is born prematurely and in poor health, and is in need of a blood transfusion. Johnny and Sarah are ultimately nervous not only about the baby's survival chances, but also of the skyrocketing hospital bills that will now need to be paid following the baby's delivery, causing Sarah to have a brief nervous breakdown and blame Johnny for Frankie's death, and tearfully berate him.

However, after calming her down, Johnny and Sarah agree to the blood transfusion but without giving the baby "bad blood," as using hospital blood banks was the source of Mateo's contraction of HIV. Shortly, it is discovered that Christy has a compatible blood type to donate with, and Mateo's death coincides with the first healthy movements of the infant following a blood transfusion from Christy. After the successful operation, the family is startled to learn that Mateo had settled and paid for their astronomical hospital bill before he had died, upon the discovery that Mateo was in possession of a large trust fund he never spent. They give the newborn baby girl the middle name of Mateo in gratitude and to honor his memory.

With the birth of the new baby and the death of Mateo, Johnny finally is able to overcome his lack of emotion and put his grieving for Frankie to rest. He also finally catches a break by getting a small role in A Chorus Line on Broadway.  The film ends after a baby shower at the apartment is held for the Sullivan family with many of the apartment tenants present to celebrate, and Christy and the rest of her family take in the view of the city and look out for Mateo in the night's sky.

Cast
 Samantha Morton as Sarah Sullivan
 Paddy Considine as Johnny Sullivan
 Sarah Bolger as Christy Sullivan
 Emma Bolger as Ariel Sullivan
 Djimon Hounsou as Mateo Kuamey
 Merrina Millsapp as Marina, waitress at the "Heaven" ice cream parlor
 Adrian Martinez as Shopkeeper

Production
The film is dedicated to director/screenwriter Jim Sheridan's brother Frankie, who died at the age of ten. In The Making of in America, a featurette on the DVD release of the film, Sheridan explains Christy and Ariel are based on his daughters—and co-writers—Naomi and Kirsten. He says they wanted to make a film showing how people can learn to overcome their pain and live for the future instead of dwelling on the sadness of the past.

Manhattan locations include Hell's Kitchen, Times Square, the Lincoln Tunnel, and 8th Street in the East Village.

Interiors were filmed at the Ardmore Studios in County Wicklow in Ireland. The fairground scene was filmed on Parnell Street, Dublin.

The soundtrack includes songs performed by The Lovin' Spoonful, Culture Club, The Corrs, The Byrds, Kid Creole and The Coconuts, Evan Olson, and The Langhorns.

Release
The film premiered at the 2002 Toronto International Film Festival. In 2003, it was shown at the Sundance Film Festival, the Boston Irish Film Festival, the Tribeca Film Festival, the Edinburgh Film Festival, the Hamburg Film Festival, the Warsaw Film Festival, the Dinard Festival of British Cinema, and the Austin Film Festival.

Box office
The film opened in the UK on 31 October 2003, where it earned £284,259 on its opening weekend. It opened in limited release in the US on 26 November. It eventually grossed $15,539,656 in the US and $9,843,255 elsewhere, for a total worldwide box office of $25,382,911

Critical reception
Rotten Tomatoes gave the film a score of 89%, based on 177 reviews, and an average rating of 7.75/10. The website's critical consensus states, "A rich and moving story about an immigrant family adjusting to life in New York". Metacritic assigned the film a weighted average score of 76 out of 100, based on 41 critics, indicating "generally favorable reviews".

In his review in The New York Times, A. O. Scott called it a "modest, touching film" and added, "Many of [its] elements . . . seem to promise a sticky bath of shameless sentimentality. But instead, thanks to Jim Sheridan's graceful, scrupulously sincere direction and the dry intelligence of his cast, In America is likely to pierce the defenses of all but the most dogmatically cynical viewers . . . Mr. Sheridan is more interested in particular people than in general plights, and what lingers in the mind after you have seen his movies is the rough, radiant individuality of his characters . . . This movie, from moment to moment, feels small, almost anecdotal. It is only afterward that, like Mr. Sheridan's other films, it starts to grow into something at once unassuming and in its own way grand."

Roger Ebert of the Chicago Sun-Times observed, "In America is not unsentimental about its new arrivals (the movie has a warm heart and frankly wants to move us), but it is perceptive about the countless ways in which it is hard to be poor and a stranger in a new land."

In the San Francisco Chronicle, Walter Addiego stated, "I fought hard against the emotionalism of In America . . . but I lost. There's no questioning the director's ability to wring moving moments from potentially sentimental and decidedly familiar material: the story of penniless immigrants trying to make it in Manhattan. It got to me. I'm still trying to decide whether I was won over or worn down — but why not give Sheridan the benefit of the doubt? . . . [He] is clearly drawing on deep personal reserves for this picture, and despite a few sequences when the creative hand seems intrusive, does well by his subject. When you see a director going for that lump-in-the-throat mood, instinct takes over and you want to dig in your heels. Sometimes it's best just to let yourself be swept away."

Peter Travers of Rolling Stone rated the film three out of a possible four stars, calling it "forceful, funny and impassioned" and "an emotional wipeout".

In the St. Petersburg Times, Steve Persall graded the film A and added, "This is a tearjerker for all the right reasons. Because it's delicately manipulative and the characters are so precisely emotional. And because Sheridan's manner with the material makes crying seem like a cleansing, an affirmation that something so simple and sweet can still move us . . . I loved this unassuming, heartfelt little gem, even if I couldn't stop sobbing for an hour after the show. It's just so beautiful."

Claudia Puig of USA Today called it "touching, but not cloying, uplifting and hopeful but never sappy and also just plain funny. There is not a false note among the five core performances, nor a false word in Sheridan's script. In America is a classic story of losing and finding faith told with heart, humor and emotional heft."

In The Observer, Philip French said, "The movie lacks conviction from implausible beginning to sentimental end."

Accolades

References

External links
 
 
 
 
 

2002 films
2000s drama road movies
American drama road movies
Irish drama road movies
Irish Diaspora films
British drama road movies
English-language Irish films
Fox Searchlight Pictures films
2002 independent films
Irish-language films
Films about immigration to the United States
Films directed by Jim Sheridan
Drama films based on actual events
British films set in New York City
Films set in the 1980s
Films shot in Ireland
Films shot in New Jersey
Films shot in New York City
American independent films
Irish independent films
British independent films
Films about Irish-American culture
2002 drama films
Films about sisters
2000s English-language films
2000s American films
2000s British films